Carlos Taberner Segarra (born 8 August 1997) is a Spanish professional tennis player.

Taberner has a career high ATP singles ranking of world No. 85 achieved on 23 May 2022. He also has a career high ATP doubles ranking of world No. 337 achieved on 18 September 2017. He has reached 17 career ITF singles finals, with a record of 8 wins and 9 losses. He has won five ATP Challenger singles titles: the 2020 Iași Open, the 2021 Antalya Challenger II, the 2021 Open du Pays d'Aix and the 2021 Lošinj Open and 2022 Challenger di Roseto degli Abruzzi. Additionally, he has reached seven career ITF doubles finals with a record of 4 wins and 3 losses which includes one ATP Challenger doubles title at the 2017 San Benedetto Tennis Cup.

Professional career

2018: ATP and Grand Slam debut
Taberner made his ATP Tour debut at the 2018 Open Sud de France in Marseilles where he advanced through 2 qualifying matches to reach the main draw. In qualifying, he defeated Benjamin Bonzi 6–2, 6–4 and Marco Trungelliti 4–6, 6–2, 6–4, where he then won his first round match against Norbert Gombos in two tie-breakers 7–6(7–5), 7–6(7–1). His run would end in the second round, as he was defeated by Lucas Pouille in straight sets 1–6, 2–6.

He made his Grand Slam debut in the main draw at the 2018 French Open as a qualifier where he lost to Stefanos Tsitsipas.

2021: Challenger tour success, top 100 & Masters debut & first win
He also qualified for the 2021 French Open where he lost to Roman Safiullin.

He won his third Challenger title at the 2021 Open du Pays d'Aix defeating Manuel Guinard. As a result, he reached a career-high ranking of World No. 113 on 21 June 2021.

He entered the main draw as a direct entry for the first time at the 2021 US Open (tennis) on his debut at this Major. He also entered directly into the main draw for his second Masters 1000 of the season and in his career at the 2021 BNP Paribas Open and made it to the second round, recording his first win at this level by defeating fellow Spaniard Jaume Munar.

In October he won his fourth Challenger at the 2021 Lošinj Open and made his debut in the top 100 at World No. 93 on 25 October 2021.

2022: Second ATP 500 win
He made his debut at the 2022 Australian Open losing to Dominik Koepfer.

He earned his first and second ATP wins of the season at the 2022 Córdoba Open against 5th seeded Argentinian Federico Delbonis and at the 2022 Chile Open against another Argentine Juan Manuel Cerundolo.

At the 2022 Barcelona Open Banc Sabadell he earned as a qualifier his second ATP 500 (after the Hamburg European Open in 2021) and biggest win thus far in the season where he bagelled Sebastian Korda in the second set.

He made also his debut at the 2022 Wimbledon Championships where he lost to 15th seed Reilly Opelka.

2023
He made the main draw as lucky loser in Santiago, Chile after the withdrawal of Bernabe Zapata Miralles.

Challenger and Futures Finals

Singles: 17 (8–9)

Doubles: 7 (4–3)

Performance timeline

Singles

Record against top 10 players
Taberner's record against players who have been ranked in the top 10, with those who are active in boldface. Only ATP Tour main draw matches are considered:

References

External links
 
 

1997 births
Living people
Spanish male tennis players
Sportspeople from Valencia
Tennis players from the Valencian Community